is a Japanese manga series written and illustrated by Shinobu Kaitani. It was serialized in Shueisha's seinen manga magazine Business Jump from May 2007 to October 2011, with its chapters collected in seven tankōbon volumes. It was adapted into a nine-episode television drama series, broadcast on TV Asahi in 2010.

Media

Manga
Written and illustrated by Shinobu Kaitani, Reinōryokusha Odagiri Kyōko no Uso was serialized in Shueisha's seinen manga magazine Business Jump from May 15, 2007, to October 5, 2011, when the magazine ceased its publication. Business Jump was succeeded by Grand Jump, and it was announced that series would continue there; however, no further information was released. Shueisha collected its chapters in seven tankōbon  volumes, released from February 19, 2008, to February 24, 2012.

Volume list

Drama
The manga was adapted into a nine-episode television drama series, which was broadcast on TV Asahi from October 10 to December 5, 2010.

References

External links
 
 

Comedy anime and manga
Mystery anime and manga
Seinen manga
Shueisha manga
TV Asahi television dramas